The Liga Norte de México (LNM) (English: Northern League of México) is a professional baseball league located in the Northwest of Mexico in the states of Sonora, Baja California, and Baja California Sur. Formerly known as Liga Norte de Sonora from 1968 to 1969, it acts as a feeder league for the Mexican League in the summer.

Teams

Champions

Liga Norte de México Championships by team

Defunct teams

References

External links 
 Official site(Spanish)

Norte
Mexican League
Professional sports leagues in Mexico